Nenad Gavrić (born 12 December 1991) is a Serbian professional footballer who plays as a forward for Greek Super League 2 club Xanthi.

Club career
Born in Šabac, Nenad started playing senior football with Mačva Šabac. Playing with the club, Gavrić made 83 appearances in the Serbian League West and scored 27 goals.

Gavrić joined Napredak Kruševac in January 2012 and took squad number 44. He played mostly matches during the second half of 2011–12 Serbian First League season, collecting 13 matches with 11 starts, and scored 4 goals. For the next season, he changed his jersey number to 12. He made 28 league and 1 appearance with all starts, and scored 14 goals, promoting himself to the second team scorer of team, behind Nenad Mirosavljević, and the fourth highest scorer for the 2012–13 Serbian First League. Playing with the team, he usually played as a winger, frequently switching sides with Nikola Trujić.

In summer 2014, Gavrić signed with Red Star Belgrade after new coach Nenad Lalatović had insisted on a transfer. He made his debut for the club in the 3rd fixture of the 2014–15 Serbian SuperLiga, played on 23 August 2014, when he replaced Nejc Pečnik in 60 minute of the match against Vojvodina. During the season, Gavrić played 15 league and 2 cup matches scoring 2 goals, both for the first half-season. He was also with the club for the 2015–16, but made just 8 appearances at total under Miodrag Božović.

On last day of the summer 2016 transfer window, Gavrić signed with Vojvodina. He noted five appearances for the club, but had some conflict with club later and spent the rest of first half-season without of the first team.

In the winter break off-season, Gavrić moved to Mladost Lučani. Playing for Mladost, Gavrić capped 15 times in at total in all competitions and scored 1 goal. In August 2017 he left the club as a free agent. On the last day of the summer transfer window 2017, Gavrić returned for second spell to his home club Mačva Šabac.

Career statistics

Honours
Napredak Kruševac
 Serbian First League: 2012–13
Red Star Belgrade
 Serbian SuperLiga: 2015–16

References

External links
 Nenad Gavrić stats at utakmica.rs
 
 
 
 

1991 births
Living people
Sportspeople from Šabac
Association football forwards
Serbian footballers
FK Mačva Šabac players
FK Napredak Kruševac players
Red Star Belgrade footballers
FK Vojvodina players
FK Mladost Lučani players
FK Radnički Niš players
FC Caspiy players
Serbian First League players
Serbian SuperLiga players
Serbian expatriate footballers
Expatriate footballers in Kazakhstan